Arslan Eyce Private Amphora Museum, also known as Taşucu Amphora Museum, is a maritime archaeology museum dedicated to amphora in Taşucu, southern Turkey.

Formerly, it was an important port. The museum is located in a 19th-century building on the İsmet İnönü Boulevard, which was originally a storage building. The building now is a property of the museum foundation. Arslan Eyce, a citizen of Silifke, spent 40 years in collecting ancient amphorae mostly from shipwrecks. In 1997, the Ministry of Culture and Tourism (Turkey) took over the collection. After maintenance, the museum was officially opened in 2003.

There are 400 amphorae in the museum. The exhibited amphorae span a long time from 3200 BC to 1800 AD.

References

Museums established in 2003
Museums in Mersin Province
Archaeological museums in Turkey
2003 establishments in Turkey
Maritime archaeology
Silifke District